The Wikimedia Foundation, Inc., or Wikimedia for short and abbreviated as WMF, is an American 501(c)(3) nonprofit organization headquartered in San Francisco, California and registered as a charitable foundation under local laws. Best known as the hosting platform for Wikipedia, a crowdsourced online encyclopedia, it also hosts other related projects and MediaWiki, a wiki software.

The Wikimedia Foundation was established in 2003 in St. Petersburg, Florida, by Jimmy Wales as a nonprofit way to fund Wikipedia, Wiktionary, and other crowdsourced wiki projects that had until then been hosted by Bomis, Wales's for-profit company. The Foundation finances itself mainly through millions of small donations from Wikipedia readers, collected through email campaigns and annual fundraising banners placed on Wikipedia and its sister projects. These are complemented by grants from philanthropic organizations and tech companies, and starting in 2022, by services income from Wikimedia Enterprise.

The Foundation has grown rapidly throughout its existence.

Mission 
The Wikimedia Foundation's mission is "to empower and engage people around the world to collect and develop educational content under a free license or in the public domain, and to disseminate it effectively and globally."

To serve this mission, the Foundation provides the technical and organizational infrastructure to enable members of the public to develop wiki content in multiple languages. The Foundation does not write or curate any of the content on the wikis itself. It collaborates with a network of individual volunteers and affiliated organizations such as Wikimedia chapters, thematic organizations, user groups and other partners in different countries all over the world, and promises in its mission statement to make useful information from its projects available on the internet free of charge in perpetuity. It also engages in political advocacy. The Foundation's strategic direction, formulated in 2017, envisages that it "will become the essential infrastructure of the ecosystem of free knowledge" by 2030.

History 

Jimmy Wales and Larry Sanger founded Wikipedia in 2001 as a feeder project to supplement Nupedia. The project was originally funded by Bomis, Wales's for-profit business, and edited by a rapidly growing community of volunteer editors. The early community discussed a variety of ways to support the ongoing costs of upkeep, and was broadly opposed to running ads on the site, so the idea of setting up a charitable foundation gained prominence. That also addressed an open question of what entity should hold onto trademarks for the project. 

The name "Wikimedia", a compound of wiki and media, was coined by American author Sheldon Rampton in a post to the English Wikipedia mailing list in March 2003, three months after Wiktionary became the second wiki-based project hosted on the original server. The Wikimedia Foundation was incorporated in Florida on June 20, 2003.  A small fundraising campaign to keep the servers running was run in October 2003.  The Foundation was granted section 501(c)(3) status by the U.S. Internal Revenue Code as a public charity in 2005, making donations to the Foundation tax-deductible for U.S. federal income tax purposes. Its National Taxonomy of Exempt Entities (NTEE) code is B60 (Adult, Continuing education). 

The Foundation applied to trademark the name Wikipedia in the US on September 14, 2004. The mark was granted registration status on January 10, 2006. Trademark protection was accorded by Japan on December 16, 2004, and by the European Union on January 20, 2005. Subsets of Wikipedia were already being distributed in book and DVD form, and there were discussions about licensing the logo and wordmark. 

On December 11, 2006, the Foundation's board noted that it could not become a membership organization, as initially planned but not implemented, due to an inability to meet the registration requirements of Florida statutory law. The bylaws were accordingly amended to remove all references to membership rights and activities.

In 2007, the Foundation decided to move its headquarters from Florida to the San Francisco Bay Area. Considerations cited for choosing San Francisco were proximity to like-minded organizations and potential partners, a better talent pool, as well as cheaper and more convenient international travel. The move was completed by January 31, 2008, into a headquarters on Stillman Street in San Francisco. It later moved to New Montgomery Street, and then to One Montgomery Tower.

On October 25, 2021, the Foundation launched Wikimedia Enterprise, a commercial Wikimedia content delivery service aimed at groups that want to use high-volume APIs, starting with Big Tech enterprises. In June 2022, Google and the Internet Archive were announced as the service's first customers, though only Google will pay for the service. The same announcement noted a shifting focus towards smaller companies with similar data needs, supporting the service through "a lot paying a little".

Projects and initiatives

Wikimedia projects 

Content on most Wikimedia project websites is licensed for redistribution under v3.0 of the Attribution and Share-alike Creative Commons licenses. The Foundation owns and operates 11 wikis that are written, curated, designed, and governed by their communities of volunteer editors. Any member of the public is welcomed to contribute; registering a named user account is optional. These wikis follow a free content model, with the stated goal of disseminating knowledge to the world. They include, by launch date:

 Wikipedia – online encyclopedia
 Wiktionary – online dictionary and thesaurus
 Wikibooks – collection of books, mostly textbooks
 Wikiquote – collection of quotations
 Wikivoyage – travel guide
 Wikisource – digital library
 Wikimedia Commons – repository of images, sounds, videos, and general media
 Wikispecies – taxonomic catalog of species
 Wikinews – online newspaper
 Wikiversity – collection of tutorials and courses, also a hosting point to coordinate research
 Wikidata – knowledge base

Certain additional projects provide infrastructure or coordination of the free knowledge projects. These include:

 Meta-Wiki – central site for coordinating all projects and the Wikimedia community
 Wikimedia Incubator – a single wiki for drafting the core pages of new language-editions in development 
 MediaWiki – site for coordinating work on MediaWiki software
 Wikitech – including Wikimedia Cloud Services, Data Services, Toolforge, and other technical projects and infrastructure
 Phabricator – not a wiki, but a global ticketing system for tracking issues and feature requests

Affiliates 

Wikimedia affiliates are independent and formally recognized groups of people working together to support and contribute to the Wikimedia movement. The Wikimedia Foundation recognizes three types of affiliates: chapters, thematic organizations, and user groups. Affiliates organize and engage in activities to support and contribute to the Wikimedia movement, such as regional conferences, outreach, edit-a-thons, hackathons, public relations, public policy advocacy, GLAM engagement, and Wikimania. While many of these things are also done by individual contributors or less formal groups, they are not referred to as affiliates.

Recognition of chapters and thematic organizations, which must be incorporated non-profits, is approved by the Foundation's board on the recommendation of an Affiliations Committee composed of Wikimedia community members. The Affiliations Committee directly approves the recognition of unincorporated user groups. Affiliates are formally recognized by the Wikimedia Foundation, but are independent of it, with no legal control of or responsibility for Wikimedia projects and their content.

The Foundation began recognizing chapters in 2004. In 2012, the Foundation approved, finalized and adopted the thematic organization and user group recognition models. An additional model for movement partners, was also approved, but  has not yet been finalized or adopted.

Wikimania 

Wikimania is an annual global conference for Wikimedians and Wikipedians, started in 2005. The first Wikimania was held in Frankfurt, Germany, in 2005. Wikimania is organized by a committee supported usually by the local national chapter, with support from local institutions (such as a library or university) and usually from the Wikimedia Foundation. Wikimania has been held in cities such as Buenos Aires, Cambridge, Haifa, Hong Kong, Taipei, London, Mexico City, Esino Lario, Italy, Montreal, Cape Town, and Stockholm. The 2020 conference scheduled to take place in Bangkok was canceled due to the COVID-19 pandemic, along with those of 2021 and 2022, which were held online as a series of virtual, interactive presentations. In 2023 it is scheduled to be held in Singapore.

Technology 

The Wikimedia Foundation maintains the hardware that runs its projects in its own servers.  It also maintains the MediaWiki platform and many other software libraries that run its projects.

Hardware 

Wikipedia employed a single server until 2004 when the server setup was expanded into a distributed multitier architecture. Server downtime in 2003 led to the first fundraising drive.

By December 2009, Wikimedia ran on co-located servers, with 300 servers in Florida and 44 in Amsterdam. In 2008, it also switched from multiple different Linux operating system vendors to Ubuntu Linux. In 2019, it switched to Debian.

By January 2013, Wikimedia transitioned to newer infrastructure in an Equinix facility in Ashburn, Virginia, citing reasons of "more reliable connectivity" and "fewer hurricanes". In years prior, the hurricane seasons had been a cause of distress.

In October 2013, Wikimedia Foundation started looking for a second facility that would be used side by side with the main facility in Ashburn, citing reasons of redundancy (e.g. emergency fallback) and to prepare for simultaneous multi-datacenter service. This followed a year in which a fiber cut caused the Wikimedia projects to be unavailable for one hour in August 2012.

Apart from the second facility for redundancy coming online in 2014, the number of servers needed to run the infrastructure in a single facility has been mostly stable since 2009. As of November 2015, the main facility in Ashburn hosts 520 servers in total which includes servers for newer services besides Wikimedia project wikis, such as cloud services (Toolforge) and various services for metrics, monitoring, and other system administration.

In 2017, Wikimedia Foundation deployed a caching cluster in an Equinix facility in Singapore, the first of its kind in Asia.

Software 
The operation of Wikimedia depends on MediaWiki, a custom-made, free and open-source wiki software platform written in PHP and built upon the MariaDB database since 2013; previously the MySQL database was used. The software incorporates programming features such as a macro language, variables, a transclusion system for templates, and URL redirection. MediaWiki is licensed under the GNU General Public License and it is used by all Wikimedia projects.

Originally, Wikipedia ran on UseModWiki written in Perl by Clifford Adams (Phase I), which initially required CamelCase for article hyperlinks; the double bracket style was incorporated later. Starting in January 2002 (Phase II), Wikipedia began running on a PHP wiki engine with a MySQL database; this software was custom-made for Wikipedia by Magnus Manske. The Phase II software was repeatedly modified to accommodate the exponentially increasing demand. In July 2002 (Phase III), Wikipedia shifted to the third-generation software, MediaWiki, originally written by Lee Daniel Crocker.

Some MediaWiki extensions are installed to extend the functionality of MediaWiki software. In April 2005, an Apache Lucene extension was added to MediaWiki's built-in search and Wikipedia switched from MySQL to Lucene and later switched to CirrusSearch which is based on Elasticsearch for searching. The Wikimedia Foundation also uses CiviCRM and WordPress.

The Foundation published official Wikipedia mobile apps for Android and iOS devices and in March 2015, the apps were updated to include mobile user-friendly features.

Finances 

The Wikimedia Foundation mainly finances itself through donations from the public, collected through email campaigns and annual fundraising banners placed on Wikipedia, as well as grants from various tech companies and philanthropic organizations. Campaigns for the Wikimedia Endowment have included emails asking donors to leave Wikimedia money in their will.

As a 501c3 charity, the Foundation is exempt from federal and state income tax. It is not a private foundation, and contributions to it qualify as tax-deductible charitable contributions. In 2007, 2008 and 2009, Charity Navigator gave Wikimedia an overall rating of four out of four possible stars, increased from three to four stars in 2010. , the rating was still four stars (overall score 98.14 out of 100), based on data from FY2018.

The Foundation also increases its revenue by federal grants, sponsorship, services and brand merchandising. The Wikimedia OAI-PMH update feed service, targeted primarily at search engines and similar bulk analysis and republishing, was a source of revenue for a number of years. DBpedia was given access to this feed free of charge. An expanded version of data feeds and content services was launched in 2021 as Wikimedia Enterprise, an LLC subsidiary of the Foundation.

In July 2014, the Foundation announced it would accept Bitcoin donations. In 2021, cryptocurrencies accounted for just 0.08% of all donations and on May 1, 2022, the Foundation stopped accepting cryptocurrency donations, following a Wikimedia community vote.

In 2020, the Foundation donated  to Tides Advocacy to create a "Knowledge Equity Fund", to provide grants to organizations whose work would not otherwise be covered by Wikimedia grants but addresses racial inequities in accessing and contributing to free knowledge resources.

Wikimedia Endowment 
In January 2016, the Foundation announced the creation of an endowment to safeguard its future. The Wikimedia Endowment was established as a donor-advised fund at the Tides Foundation, with a stated goal to raise  in the next 10 years. Craig Newmark was one of the initial donors, giving . Peter Baldwin and his wife, Lisbet Rausing, donated  to it in 2017.

In 2018, major donations to the endowment were received from Amazon and Facebook ( each) and George Soros.  In 2019, donations included  from Google,  more from Baldwin and Rausing,  more from Newmark, and another  from Amazon in October 2019 and again in September 2020.

As of 2022, the advisory board consists of Jimmy Wales, Peter Baldwin, former Wikimedia Foundation Trustees Patricio Lorente and Phoebe Ayers, former Wikimedia Foundation Board Visitor Doron Weber of the Sloan Foundation, investor Annette Campbell-White, businessman Niels Christian Nielsen, and venture capitalist Michael Kim.

The Foundation itself has provided annual grants of $5 million to its Endowment since 2016. These amounts have been recorded as part of the Foundation's "awards and grants" expenses. In September 2021, the Foundation announced that the Wikimedia Endowment had reached its initial $100 million fundraising goal in June 2021, five years ahead of its initial target.

Financial development 
The Foundation summarizes its assets in the "Statements of Activities" in its audited reports. These do not include funds in the Wikimedia Endowment, however expenses from the 2015–16 financial year onward include payments to the Wikimedia Endowment.

Expenses 
A plurality of Wikimedia Foundation expenses are salaries and wages, followed by community and affiliate grants, contributions to the endowment, and other professional operating expenses and services.

Grants 

The Wikimedia Foundation has received a steady stream of grants from other foundations throughout its history.
In 2008, the Foundation received a  grant from the Open Society Institute to create a printable version of Wikipedia. In March 2008, the Foundation announced what was then its largest donation yet: a three-year,  grant from the Sloan Foundation.

In 2009, the Foundation received four grants. The first was a  Stanton Foundation grant to help study and simplify the user interface for first-time authors of Wikipedia. The second was a  Ford Foundation grant in July 2009 for Wikimedia Commons, to improve the interface for uploading multimedia files. In August 2009, the Foundation received a  grant from The William and Flora Hewlett Foundation.

In 2010, Google donated  and the Stanton Foundation granted $1.2 million to fund the Public Policy Initiative, a pilot program for what later became the Wikipedia Education Program (and the spin-off Wiki Education Foundation).

In March 2011, the Sloan Foundation authorized another  grant, to be funded over three years, with the first  to come in July 2011 and the remaining  to be funded in August 2012 and 2013. As a donor, Doron Weber from the Sloan Foundation gained Board Visitor status at the Wikimedia Foundation Board of Trustees. As of 2011, this was the largest grant the Wikimedia Foundation had ever received. In November 2011, the Foundation received a  donation from the Brin Wojcicki Foundation.

In 2014, the Foundation received the largest single gift in its history, a $5 million unrestricted donation from an anonymous donor supporting $1 million worth of expenses annually for the next five years. In March 2012, The Gordon and Betty Moore Foundation, established by the Intel co-founder and his wife, awarded the Wikimedia Foundation a  grant to develop Wikidata. This was part of a larger grant, much of which went to Wikimedia Germany, which took on ownership of the development effort.

Between 2014 and 2015, the Foundation received  from the Monarch Fund,  from the Arcadia Fund and an undisclosed amount from the Stavros Niarchos Foundation to support the Wikipedia Zero initiative.

In 2015, a grant agreement was reached with the John S. and James L. Knight Foundation to build a search engine called the "Knowledge Engine", a project that proved controversial. In 2017, the Sloan Foundation awarded another  grant for a three-year period, and Google donated another $1.1 million to the Foundation in 2019.

The following have donated  or more each (2008–2019, not including gifts to the Wikimedia Endowment; list may be incomplete):

Staff

History

In 2004, the Foundation appointed Tim Starling as developer liaison to help improve the MediaWiki software, Daniel Mayer as chief financial officer (finance, budgeting, and coordination of fund drives), and Erik Möller as content partnership coordinator. In May 2005, the Foundation announced seven more official appointments.

In January 2006, the Foundation created a number of committees, including the Communication Committee, in an attempt to further organize activities somewhat handled by volunteers at that time. Starling resigned that month to spend more time on his PhD program.

, the Foundation had five paid employees: two programmers, an administrative assistant, a coordinator handling fundraising and grants, and an interim executive director, Brad Patrick, previously the Foundation's general counsel. Patrick ceased his activity as interim director in January 2007 and then resigned from his position as legal counsel, effective April 1, 2007. He was replaced by Mike Godwin who served as general counsel and legal coordinator from July 2007 to 2010.

In January 2007, Carolyn Doran was named chief operating officer and Sandy Ordonez joined as head of communications. Doran began working as a part-time bookkeeper in 2006 after being sent by a temporary agency. Doran, found to have had a criminal record, left the Foundation in July 2007 and Sue Gardner was hired as consultant and special advisor; she became the executive director in December 2007. Florence Devouard cited Doran's departure from the organization as one of the reasons the Foundation took about seven months to release its fiscal 2007 financial audit.

Danny Wool, officially the grant coordinator and also involved in fundraising and business development, resigned in March 2007. He accused Wales of misusing the Foundation's funds for recreational purposes and said that Wales had his Wikimedia credit card taken away in part because of his spending habits, a claim Wales denied. In February 2007, the Foundation added a position, chapters coordinator, and hired Delphine Ménard, who had been occupying the position as a volunteer since August 2005. Cary Bass was hired in March 2007 in the position of volunteer coordinator. In January 2008, the Foundation appointed Veronique Kessler as the new chief financial and operating officer, Kul Wadhwa as head of business development and Jay Walsh as head of communications.

In March 2013, Gardner announced she would be leaving her position at the Foundation. Lila Tretikov was appointed executive director in May 2014; she resigned in March 2016. Former chief communications officer Katherine Maher was appointed the interim executive director, a position made permanent in June 2016. Maher served as executive director until April 2021.

Present department structure

 there were around 700 people working at the Foundation. Maryana Iskander was named the incoming CEO in September 2021, and took over that role in January 2022.

As of July 2022, the WMF has the following department structure:
 Advancement: responsible for fundraising, strategic partnerships, and grantmaking programs.
 Communications: responsible for Wikimedia brand development, marketing, social media, public relations, and global awareness efforts.
 Finance and Administration: responsible for ensuring responsible management of Wikimedia Foundation funds and resources.
 Legal: responsible for mounting opposition to government surveillance and censorship, defending volunteer communities, facilitating policy discussions, and advocating for privacy.
 Product: responsible for building collaborative tools for knowledge sharing, user research, experience design and cross-device support including mobile apps and voice technology.
 Talent and Culture: responsible for recruitment and training.
 Technology: responsible for maintaining and developing the technology platform underpinning the Wikimedia projects, in collaboration with thousands of volunteer developers.

Board of Trustees 

The Foundation's board of trustees supervises the activities of the Foundation. The founding board had three members, to which two community-elected trustees were added.  Starting in 2008 it was composed of ten members:
 three selected by the community encompassed by all the different Wikimedia projects;
 two selected by Wikimedia chapters;
 four appointed by the board itself; and
 one founder's seat, reserved for Jimmy Wales.

Over time, the size of the board and details of the selection processes have evolved.  As of 2020, the board may have up to 16 trustees:
 eight seats sourced from the wider Wikimedia community (affiliates and volunteer community);
 seven appointed by the board itself; and
 one founder's seat reserved for Wales.
, the board comprised six community-and-affiliate-selected trustees (Shani Evenstein Sigalov, Dariusz Jemielniak, Rosie Stephenson-Goodknight, Victoria Doronina, Mike Peel and Lorenzo Losa); five Board-appointed trustees (McKinsey & Company director Raju Narisetti, Bahraini human rights activist and blogger Esra'a Al Shafei, management consulting executive Lisa Lewin, Nataliia Tymkiv, and McAfee executive Tanya Capuano); and Wales. Tymkiv chairs the board, with Al Shafei and Sigalov as vice chairs.

In 2015, James Heilman, a trustee recently elected to the board by the community, was removed from his position by a vote of the rest of the board. This decision generated dispute among members of the Wikipedia community. Heilman later said that he "was given the option of resigning [by the Board] over the last few weeks. As a community elected member I see my mandate as coming from the community which elected me and thus declined to do so. I saw such a move as letting down those who elected me." He subsequently added that while on the Board, he had pushed for greater transparency regarding the Wikimedia Foundation's Knowledge Engine project and its financing, and indicated that his attempts to make public the Knight Foundation grant for the engine had been a factor in his dismissal. Heilman was reelected to the board by the community in 2017.

In January 2016, Arnnon Geshuri joined the board before stepping down amid community controversy about a "no poach" agreement he executed when at Google, which violated United States antitrust law and for which the participating companies paid US$415 million in a class action suit on behalf of affected employees.

Independent contractors 
Among firms regularly listed as independent contractors in the Wikimedia Foundation's Form 990 disclosures are the law firm Jones Day and the PR firm Minassian Media; the latter was founded by Craig Minassian, a full-time executive at the Clinton Foundation.

Disputes 

A number of disputes have resulted in litigation while others have not. Attorney Matt Zimmerman has said, "Without strong liability protection, it would be difficult for Wikipedia to continue to provide a platform for user-created encyclopedia content."

In December 2011, the Foundation hired Washington, D.C., lobbyist Dow Lohnes Government Strategies LLC to lobby Congress. At the time of the hire, the Foundation was concerned about a bill known as the Stop Online Piracy Act. The communities were as well, organizing some of the most visible protest against the bill on the Internet alongside other popular websites.

In October 2013, a German court ruled that the Wikimedia Foundation can be held liable for content added to Wikipedia when there has been a specific complaint; otherwise, the Wikimedia Foundation does not check the content Wikipedia publishes and has no duty to do so.

In June 2014, Bildkonst Upphovsrätt i Sverige filed a copyright infringement lawsuit against Wikimedia Sweden.

On June 20, 2014, a defamation lawsuit (Law Division civil case No. L-1400-14) involving Wikipedia editors was filed with the Mercer County Superior Court in New Jersey seeking, inter alia, compensatory and punitive damages.

In a March 10, 2015, op-ed for The New York Times, Wales and Tretikov announced the Foundation was filing a lawsuit against the National Security Agency and five other government agencies and officials, including DOJ, calling into question its practice of mass surveillance, which they argued infringed the constitutional rights of the Foundation's readers, editors and staff. They were joined in the suit by eight additional plaintiffs, including Amnesty International and Human Rights Watch. On October 23, 2015, the United States District Court for the District of Maryland dismissed the suit Wikimedia Foundation v. NSA on grounds of standing. U.S. District Judge T. S. Ellis III ruled that the plaintiffs could not plausibly prove they were subject to upstream surveillance, and that their argument is "riddled with assumptions", "speculations" and "mathematical gymnastics". The plaintiffs filed an appeal with the United States Court of Appeals for the Fourth Circuit on February 17, 2016.

In September 2020, WMF's application to become an observer at the World Intellectual Property Organization (WIPO) was blocked after objections from the government of China over the existence of a Wikimedia Foundation affiliate in Taiwan. In October 2021, WMF's second application was blocked by the government of China for the same reason. In May 2022, six Wikimedia movement affiliate chapters were blocked from being accredited to WIPO's Standing Committee on Copyright and Related Rights (SCCR) by China, claiming that the chapters were spreading disinformation. In July 2022, China blocked an application by seven Wikimedia chapters to be accredited as permanent observers to WIPO; China's position was supported by a number of other countries, including Russia, Pakistan, Iran, Algeria, Zimbabwe and Venezuela.

Excessive spending and fundraising 

In 2014, Jimmy Wales was confronted with allegations that WMF had a poor cost/benefit ratio for  "a miserable cost/benefit ratio and for years now has spent millions on software development without producing anything that actually works". He acknowledged that he had "been frustrated as well about the endless controversies about the rollout of inadequate software not developed with sufficient community consultation and without proper incremental rollout to catch show-stopping bugs".

During the 2015 fundraising campaign, some members of the community voiced their concerns about the fundraising banners. They argued that they were obtrusive and could deceive potential donors by giving the impression that Wikipedia had immediate financial problems, which was not true. The Wikimedia Foundation vowed to improve wording on further fundraising campaigns to avoid these issues.

In February 2017, an op-ed published by The Signpost, the English Wikipedia's online newspaper, titled "Wikipedia has Cancer", produced a debate in both the Wikipedian community and the wider public. The author criticized the Wikimedia Foundation for its ever-increasing annual spending, which, he argued, could put the project at financial risk should an unexpected event happen. The author proposed to cap spending, build up the endowment, and restructure the endowment so that WMF cannot dip into the principal when times get bad.

Knowledge Engine project 

Knowledge Engine was a search engine project initiated in 2015 by WMF to locate and display verifiable and trustworthy information on the Internet. The KE's goal was to be less reliant on traditional search engines. It was funded with a  grant from the Knight Foundation. Some perceived the project as a scandal, mainly because it was conceived in secrecy, and the project proposal was even a surprise to some staff, in contrast with a general culture of transparency in the organization and on the projects. Some of the information available to the community was received through leaked documents published by The Signpost in 2016. Following this dispute, Wikimedia Foundation Executive Director Lila Tretikov resigned.

References

External links 

 Official website (wikimediafoundation.org)
 Wikimedia site navigation (wikimedia.org)

Organization
 Wikimedia Foundation 2022–23 Annual Plan (draft)
 Wikimedia Foundation annual reports
 Wikimedia Foundation bylaws
 Wikimedia Foundation social media profiles: Twitter, YouTube

Financials
 Wikimedia Foundation's 2020/2021 audited financial statements
 Wikimedia Foundation Form 990 tax filings

Charity status 
 Wikimedia Foundation profile at Charity Navigator, charitynavigator.org

Community
 Wikimedia mailing list archives
 Global community site for the Wikimedia Foundation's projects (meta.wikimedia.org)

 
2003 establishments in Florida
501(c)(3) organizations
Articles containing video clips
Charities based in California
Educational foundations in the United States
Free software project foundations in the United States
Jimmy Wales
Non-profit organizations based in San Francisco
Online nonprofit organizations
Organizations established in 2003
Wiki communities